TEDxWarsaw is an independently organized TED event, run annually since March 2010. It was the first and it currently is the largest TEDx event in Poland.

History 
TEDxWarsaw was founded in August 2009 by Ralph Talmont together with Adam Liwiński and Maciej Michalski. Łukasz Alwast, Julian Kozankiewicz, Małgorzata Minta and Mateusz Nowak joined the Team soon after. As at March 2017, close to 40 individuals, and numerous partners are involved on a voluntary basis in organization of public TEDx events in Warsaw.

Apart from the annual, invitation only, day-long conference, a number of smaller events are also created by Team members, notably TEDxYouth@Warsaw, TEDxWarsawSalon and TEDxWarsawPresidentialPalace - the first TEDx event in the World to be held inside such an institution. All of these are free to attend, while guests are usually required to go through an application process.

As at March 2017 well over 200 speakers and artists have appeared at the various TEDxWarsaw events, including well-known scientists, actors and performers as well as less well-known thought leaders and achievers in fields ranging from business to photography and personal development to microbiology.

Events 

The conference has grown continuously and expanded its audience size to meet demand. The fourth edition of TEDxWarsaw was watched via a live stream by a total of 42,000 people worldwide with peak viewership of 14,000 at the opening.

The 2013 event received "live"  in Gazeta Wyborcza one of the main Polish newspapers and was a trending topic on Polish Twitter. As noted in one of the blog posts about the event, TEDxWarsaw's hand-picked audience is very diverse, ranging from high school students to the elderly, and includes many different professions, from public servants to entrepreneurs and artists to scientists.

Featured Speakers

References 

Events in Warsaw
Warsaw
Spring (season) events in Poland